Death Metal Angola is a 2012 Portuguese music biographical film directed by Jeremy Xido.

Cast
 Wilker Flores
 Sonia Ferreira

Release
Death Metal Angola was released theatrically in the US on November 7, 2014.

Reception
Death Metal Angola received unanimous acclaim during its festival run. The Huffington Post's E. Nina Rothe called Death Metal Angola a "must-watch film" and "a cult-classic in the making."   indieWIRE film critic Matt Mueller  called it an “absorbing, beautifully shot documentary" and a "superb film.”  The Hollywood Reporter's Neil Young wrote, "Jeremy Xido's US-Angolan documentary traces how an extreme form of rock music has taken root in war-torn corner of south-west Africa" and stated that the film is "raucously crowd-pleasing."

References

External links
 
 
 

2012 films
2012 documentary films
American documentary films
Documentary films about singers
Biographical films about musicians
2010s Portuguese-language films
2010s American films